Shairp is a surname. Notable people with the surname include:

 Christian Fraser-Tytler (née Shairp; 1897–1995), Scottish military officer
 James Shairp (died 1795), British Marines officer and member of the First Fleet to Australia
 John Campbell Shairp (1819–1885), Scottish critic and man of letters
 Mordaunt Shairp (1887–1939), English dramatist and screenwriter

See also 
Sharp (surname)
Sharpe (surname)

English-language surnames